Eye of the Storm is the ninth studio album by Japanese rock band One Ok Rock. It was released on February 13, 2019, in Japan through A-Sketch, and on February 15, 2019, in other countries through Fueled by Ramen. The album marked a shift in their sound from the alternative rock of their previous albums to pop and electronic music. Three singles, "Change", "Stand Out Fit In", and "Wasted Nights" have been released in support of the album.

The band announced a December European tour along with album details. The band will tour North America in support of the album from February to March 2019, with support acts Waterparks and Stand Atlantic. The band also announced that they would be opening for the Asian leg of Ed Sheeran's 2019 Divide World Tour. The album debuted at number one on the Japanese Oricon Albums Chart.

Background
Vocalist Takahiro Moriuchi stated that the band "challenged and pushed ourselves to try new things while still maintaining the essence of what our band is" on the album. Moriuchi expressed a desire to create a positive album that took influence from a variety of sources, Queen being the most dominant one, but also musicals and Disney. He stated "Rock’n’roll is a lifestyle for me, not hard music, but universal - that’s why this album is super different. I was just making music, not only rock music".

The second single "Stand Out Fit In" is about not giving in to peer pressure. The video for "Stand Out, Fit In", directed by Peter Huang, was praised for its portrayal of how peer pressure affects Asian American youth. He was asked to make a video about "the Asian American experience" by the Japanese band. Moriuchi wanted to be "a positive force for Asian-Americans" after moving to the United States in 2015.

American pop singer Kiiara was brought on as a guest feature for the album, having met Moriuchi at the tribute concert for Linkin Park's late vocalist Chester Bennington. Moriuchi invited her to work with the band during a chat they had after the concert, involving Bennington's friendship with Kiiara and moving forward after his death. Linkin Park co-vocalist Mike Shinoda was also involved with production on "Eye Of The Storm", the band having met Shinoda in studio while working on their previous album Ambitions.

Release
Along with the release of the regular Japanese and international versions, initial Japanese pressings will feature a DVD with acoustic performances.

Track listing

Notes 
  denotes an additional producer
  denotes a co-producer and vocal producer

Personnel
Credits adapted from the liner notes of Eye of the Storm (Japanese edition).

One Ok Rock
 Takahiro "Taka" Moriuchi — Vocals, backing vocals (2)
 Toru Yamashita — guitar
 Ryota Kohama — bass 
 Tomoya Kanki — drums

Production 

 Dan Lancaster — production (1)
 Rhys May — production assistant (1)
 Ted Jensen — mastering (1–13)
 Kyle Moorman — additional production (1), production (8)
 Adam Hawkins — mixing (1), (3) 
 Derek Fuhrmann — production, additional guitar, synth, drum programming, backing vocals (2)  
 Jamil Kazmi — backing vocals (2)
 Serban Ghenea — mixing (2), (6), (8)
 John Hanes — engineering (2), (6), (8)
 Pete Nappi — production (3), (6), (7), (12)
 Poo Bear — production, vocal production (3)
 Jared Gutstadt — production (3)
 CJ Baran — production (4)
 Ben Romans — production (4) 
 Erik Madrid — mixing (4), (7)
 William Binderup — mix assistant (4), (7)
 David Pramik — production (5), (13), backing vocals (5)
 Alejandro Baima — assistant engineer (5)  
 Neal Avrom — mixing (5), (11)
 Scott Skrzynski — mix assistant (5), (11)
 Janée "Jin Jin" Bennett — backing vocals (6), (11) 
 Colin Brittain — production (9)
 Alex Prieto — engineering (9)
 Brendon Collins — engineering (9)
 Jonathan Gerring — additional production, programming (9)
 Tony Maserati — mixing (9), (10)
 Najeeb Jones — mix assistant (9), (10)
 Dan Book — production (10)
 Mark Crew — production, keyboard, programming (11)
 Dan Priddy — additional programming (11)
 Jack Duxbury — keyboard (11)
 Tom Lord-Alge — mixing (12), (13)

Additional musicians
 Erin Tyson-Lewis, Alex Threat-Arowora, Aja Grant, Moriah Holmes, Candace Lacy, Judah Lacy, Romaine Jones, Charles Morgan, JonJon Harrold, G-janee Davis – choir (2, 4, 6, 10)
 Jonathan Decuir — choir vocal arrangement
 Naoki Itai — Japanese vocals recording and editing

Design
 JonOne — cover artwork
 Kotaro Okusu, Yumeno Arai — design

Charts

Weekly charts

Year-end charts

Singles

Other charted songs

Certifications

Release history

See also
 List of Oricon number-one albums of 2019

References

External links 
 

2019 albums
One Ok Rock albums
A-Sketch albums
Fueled by Ramen albums
Albums produced by Colin Brittain
Albums produced by Poo Bear
Pop rock albums by Japanese artists
Electropop albums